Kren or Křen ("horseradish" in Czech and Austrian German) is a surname. Notable people with the surname include:

 Brigitte Kren (born 1954), Austrian actress
 Jan Křen (1930–2020), Czech historian
 Kurt Kren (1929–1998), Austrian filmmaker
 Marvin Kren (born 1980), Austrian director
 Milan Křen (born 1965), Czech cyclist
 Vladimir Kren (1903–1948), Croatian major general

See also
Krenn
KREN-TV
Thomas Krens, former director of the Solomon R. Guggenheim Foundation 
Dominique Crenn, a French chef

Czech-language surnames